Donald Cameron of Lochiel (1769 – 14 September 1832) was the 22nd Lochiel of Clan Cameron. He was the grandson and heir of the Gentle Lochiel, a famed Jacobite leader of the 1745 rising. By the General Act of Amnesty his Lochaber estates were restored to him in 1784. He was the titular 5th Lord Lochiel in French and Jacobite peerage.

Biography
Donald Cameron was born in Gibraltar, the eldest son of Charles Cameron, 4th Lord Lochiel (1737–1776) and Martha Marshall, daughter of Robert Marshall, an English quartermaster of the 30th regiment of Foot.

After the Battle of Culloden, Gentle Lochiel 19th chief of the clan went into exile and his lands were sequestrated by the government. Charles Cameron, son of the Lochiel of the 'Forty-Five', was allowed to return to Scotland, and lent his influence to the raising of the Lochiel men for the service of government during the American War of Independence.

In 1784 the estates of Lochiel were returned to Donald Cameron (grandson of Gentle Lochiel) under the general act of amnesty.
He was only 15 at the time and had grown up in France and London. When he left school, he travelled abroad extensively and got into serious debt. In order to raise money, the rogue chief borrowed against some of the Cameron lands which would come under his control in 1790 when he turned 21. In 1790 he visited Lochaber country for the first time. Shortly afterwards he disclosed to his guardians the deal he had done. They were not pleased. The deal was successfully challenged in court and declared null and void. Donald was judged unfit to manage the estate - which was handed over to a trust until 1819. Donald Cameron didn't stay in Lochaber for long. His wife wasn't happy there and eventually left him. He left Lochaber soon after and never lived there again.

In 1801 the trust began evicting tenants from the Cameron land. This was the beginning of the Cameron Clearances. Donald continued the evictions in 1819 when he regained control of the estate.

He later lived in Toulouse, France, estranged from his wife and children. He died there in 1832 at the age of 63.

Family
In 1795 he married Anne, daughter of famed General Sir Ralph Abercromby and Mary Anne, Baroness Abercromby, daughter of John Menzies and Anne, daughter of Patrick Campbell of Alva. They had children:
Captain Donald Cameron, 23rd Lochiel (1796–1859), who succeeded and married Lady Vere Hobart
Mary Anne Cameron (died 1850), married Admiral Lord John Hay, son of the 7th Marquess of Tweeddale, without issue
Reverend Alexander Cameron (born 1806)
Matilda Cameron (died 1894 unmarried)

Portraits 
There are two oil paintings by Henry Raeburn at Achnacarry. The first depicts Lochiel, described by Ardvorlich as 'a handsome young man in his late twenties who one suspects may have broken many hearts'! The second is of Anne, his wife, showing 'an attractive woman with a trace of sadness in her expression'.

See also

Chiefs of Clan Cameron
Clan Cameron

Notes

References

Attribution

Donald
1769 births
1832 deaths
Scottish clan chiefs
Scottish expatriates in France
Lochiel, Donald Cameron, 5th Lord